1990 Emperor's Cup Final was the 70th final of the Emperor's Cup competition. The final was played at National Stadium in Tokyo on January 1, 1991. Matsushita Electric won the championship.

Overview
Matsushita Electric won their 1st title, by defeating defending champion Nissan Motors on a penalty shoot-out.

Match details

See also
1990 Emperor's Cup

References

Emperor's Cup
1990 in Japanese football
Gamba Osaka matches
Yokohama F. Marinos matches
Japanese Cup Final 1990